KOTX is a radio station broadcasting on 98.7 FM, licensed to Hebbronville, Texas, United States. The station feeds a dependent translator, K281CB on 104.1 FM licensed to Laredo North. This translator provides coverage in the border area of  Laredo, Texas and Nuevo Laredo, Tamaulipas. KOTX is owned by Xavier Cantú, through licensee Xavier Entertainment, LLC; K281CB is owned by Grupo GAPE (Gape Group, Inc.) GAPE programs both stations with a Spanish-language news/talk format as NotiGAPE Nuevo Laredo.

History
KM Communications won a construction permit for a new FM station in Hebbronville on February 28, 2011. It assigned the permit later in the year to José Antonio Aguilar, and the station finally signed on in February 2014. It was off the air for nearly a year from March 2014 to March 2015, with Aguilar citing an inability to staff the station full-time.

In June 2018, with the combination of KOTX and translator K281CB, Grupo GAPE began programming the station as NotiGAPE Nuevo Laredo, a news/talk outlet similar to stations owned by the company on the Mexican side of the border in Reynosa and Matamoros. In this capacity, KOTX-K281CB carries Radio Fórmula programming that the network's XHNLT-FM 96.1 does not, as well as Tamaulipas statewide news from NotiGAPE and local news for the two Laredos.

In February 2020, 35 Communications—a company majority controlled by Aguilar—sold KOTX for $83,000 to Xavier Cantú. The Federal Communications Commission approved the sale on March 31, 2020, and it was consummated on May 8, 2020.

References

External links

OTX
Radio stations established in 2014
2014 establishments in Texas